De facto describes practices that exist in reality, whether or not they are officially recognized by laws or other formal norms. It is commonly used to refer to what happens in practice, in contrast with de jure ("by law"), which refers to things that happen according to official law, regardless of whether the practice exists in reality.

Jurisprudence
In jurisprudence, it mainly means "practiced, but not necessarily defined by law" or "practiced or is valid, but not officially established". Basically, this expression is opposed to the concept of "de jure" (which means "as defined by law") when it comes to law, management or technology (such as standards) in the case of creation, development or application of "without" or "against" instructions, but in accordance with "with practice". When legal situations are discussed, "de jure" means "expressed by law", while "de facto" means action or what is practiced. Similar expressions: "essentially", "unofficial", "in fact", "actually". With regards to sentencing, the term “de facto life imprisonment” is used to describe a sentence that isn’t a life sentence but it ends when the defendant is at an age where they’re likely to be dead.

Technical standards

A de facto standard is a standard (formal or informal) that has achieved a dominant position by tradition, enforcement, or market dominance. It has not necessarily received formal approval by way of a standardization process, and may not have an official standards document.

Technical standards are usually voluntary, such as ISO 9000 requirements, but may be obligatory, enforced by government norms, such as drinking water quality requirements. The term "de facto standard" is used for both: to contrast obligatory standards (also known as "de jure standards"); or to express a dominant standard, when there is more than one proposed standard.

In social sciences, a voluntary standard that is also a de facto standard, is a typical solution to a coordination problem.

Government and culture

National languages
Several countries, including Australia, Japan, Mexico, the United Kingdom and the United States, have a de facto national language but no official, de jure national language. 

Some countries have a de facto national language in addition to an official language. In Lebanon and Morocco, the official language is Arabic, but an additional de facto language is also French. In New Zealand, the official languages are Māori and New Zealand Sign Language; however, English is a third de facto language.

Russian was the de facto official language of the central government and, to a large extent, republican governments of the former Soviet Union, but was not declared de jure state language until 1990. A short-lived law, effected April 24, 1990, installed Russian as the sole de jure official language of the Union.

In Hong Kong and Macau, the Special Administrative Regions of the People's Republic of China, the official languages are English and Portuguese respectively, together with Chinese. However, no particular variety of "Chinese" referred to in law is specified. Cantonese (Hong Kong Cantonese) in traditional Chinese characters is the de facto standard in both territories.

Governance and sovereignty

A de facto government is a government wherein all the attributes of sovereignty have, by usurpation, been transferred from those who had been legally invested with them to others, who, sustained by a power above the forms of law, claim to act and do really act in their stead.

In politics, a de facto leader of a country or region is one who has assumed authority, regardless of whether by lawful, constitutional, or legitimate means; very frequently, the term is reserved for those whose power is thought by some faction to be held by unlawful, unconstitutional, or otherwise illegitimate means, often because it had deposed a previous leader or undermined the rule of a current one. De facto leaders sometimes do not hold a constitutional office and may exercise power informally.

Not all dictators are de facto rulers. For example, Augusto Pinochet of Chile initially came to power as the chairperson of a military junta, which briefly made him de facto leader of Chile, but he later amended the nation's constitution and made himself president until new elections were called, making him the formal and legal ruler of Chile. Similarly, Saddam Hussein's formal rule of Iraq is often recorded as beginning in 1979, the year he assumed the Presidency of Iraq. However, his de facto rule of the nation began earlier: during his time as vice president; he exercised a great deal of power at the expense of the elderly Ahmed Hassan al-Bakr, the de jure president.

In Argentina, the successive military coups that overthrew constitutional governments installed de facto governments in 1930–1932, 1943–1946, 1955–1958, 1966–1973 and 1976–1983, the last of which combined the powers of the presidential office with those of the National Congress. The subsequent legal analysis of the validity of such actions led to the formulation of a doctrine of the de facto governments, a case law (precedential) formulation which essentially said that the actions and decrees of past de facto governments, although not rooted in legal legitimacy when taken, remained binding until and unless such time as they were revoked or repealed de jure by a subsequent legitimate government.

That doctrine was nullified by the constitutional reform of 1994. Article 36 states:

Two examples of de facto leaders are Deng Xiaoping of the People's Republic of China and general Manuel Noriega of Panama. Both of these men exercised nearly all control over their respective nations for many years despite not having either legal constitutional office or the legal authority to exercise power. These individuals are today commonly recorded as the "leaders" of their respective nations; recording their legal, correct title would not give an accurate assessment of their power. Terms like strongman or dictator are often used to refer to de facto rulers of this sort. In the Soviet Union, after Vladimir Lenin was incapacitated from a stroke in 1923, Joseph Stalin—who, as General Secretary of the Communist Party of the Soviet Union had the power to appoint anyone he chose to top party positions—eventually emerged as leader of the Party and the legitimate government. Until the 1936 Soviet Constitution officially declared the Party "...the vanguard of the working people", thus legitimising Stalin's leadership, Stalin ruled the USSR as the de facto dictator.

Another example of a de facto ruler is someone who is not the actual ruler but exerts great or total influence over the true ruler, which is quite common in monarchies. Some examples of these de facto rulers are Empress Dowager Cixi of China (for son Tongzhi and nephew Guangxu Emperors), Prince Alexander Menshikov (for his former lover Empress Catherine I of Russia), Cardinal Richelieu of France (for Louis XIII), Queen Elisabeth of Parma (for her husband, King Philip V) and Queen Maria Carolina of Naples and Sicily (for her husband King Ferdinand I of the Two Sicilies).

The term "de facto head of state" is sometimes used to describe the office of a governor general in the Commonwealth realms, since a holder of that office has the same responsibilities in their country as the de jure head of state (the sovereign) does within the United Kingdom.

In the Westminster system of government, executive authority is often split between a de jure executive authority of a head of state and a de facto executive authority of a prime minister and cabinet who implement executive powers in the name of the de jure executive authority. In the United Kingdom, the Sovereign is the de jure executive authority, even though executive decisions are made by the indirectly elected Prime Minister and his Cabinet on the Sovereign's behalf, hence the term His Majesty's Government.

Borders 
The de facto boundaries of a country are defined by the area that its government is actually able to enforce its laws in, and to defend against encroachments by other countries that may also claim the same territory de jure. The Durand Line is an example of a de facto boundary. As well as cases of border disputes, de facto boundaries may also arise in relatively unpopulated areas in which the border was never formally established or in which the agreed border was never surveyed and its exact position is unclear. The same concepts may also apply to a boundary between provinces or other subdivisions of a federal state.

Segregation 
In South Africa, although de jure apartheid formally began in 1948, de facto racist policies and practices discriminating against black South Africans, People of Colour, and Indians dated back decades before.

De facto racial discrimination and segregation in the United States (outside of the South) until the 1950s and 1960s was simply discrimination that was  segregation by law (de jure). "Jim Crow laws", which were enacted in the 1870s, brought legal racial segregation against black Americans residing in the American South. These laws were legally ended in 1964 by the Civil Rights Act of 1964.

De facto state of war 
Most commonly used to describe large scale conflicts of the 20th century, the phrase de facto state of war refers to a situation where two nations are actively engaging, or are engaged, in aggressive military actions against the other without a formal declaration of war. 

In the 21st century, non-state actors and other non-nation state entities are also commonly involved in various conflicts.

Marriage and domestic partnerships

Relationships
A domestic partner outside marriage is referred to as a de facto husband or wife by some authorities.

In Australia
In Australia and New Zealand, the phrase "de facto" by itself has become a colloquial term for one's domestic partner. In Australian law, it is the legally recognized, committed relationship of a couple living together (opposite-sex or same-sex). De facto unions are defined in the federal Family Law Act 1975. De facto relationships provide couples who are living together on a genuine domestic basis with many of the same rights and benefits as married couples. Two people can become a de facto couple by entering into a registered relationship (i.e.: civil union or domestic partnership) or by being assessed as such by the Family Court or Federal Circuit Court. Couples who are living together are generally recognised as a de facto union and thus able to claim many of the rights and benefits of a married couple, even if they have not registered or officially documented their relationship, although this may vary by state. It has been noted that it is harder to prove de facto relationship status, particularly in the case of the death of one of the partners.

In April 2014, an Australian federal court judge ruled that a heterosexual couple who had a child and lived together for 13 years were not in a de facto relationship and thus the court had no jurisdiction to divide up their property under family law following a request for separation. In his ruling, the judge stated "de facto relationship(s) may be described as ‘marriage like’ but it is not a marriage and has significant differences socially, financially and emotionally."

The above sense of de facto is related to the relationship between common law traditions and formal (statutory, regulatory, civil) law, and common-law marriages. Common law norms for settling disputes in practical situations, often worked out over many generations to establishing precedent, are a core element informing decision making in legal systems around the world. Because its early forms originated in England in the Middle Ages, this is particularly true in Anglo-American legal traditions and in former colonies of the British Empire, while also playing a role in some countries that have mixed systems with significant admixtures of civil law.

Relationships not recognised outside Australia

Due to Australian federalism, de facto partnerships can only be legally recognised whilst the couple lives within a state in Australia. This is because the power to legislate on de facto matters relies on referrals by States to the Commonwealth in accordance with Section 51(xxxvii) of the Australian Constitution, where it states the new federal law can only be applied back within a state. There must be a nexus between the de facto relationship itself and the Australian state.

If an Australian de facto couple moves out of a state, they do not take the state with them and the new federal law is tied to the territorial limits of a state. The legal status and rights and obligations of the de facto or unmarried couple would then be recognised by the laws of the country where they are ordinarily resident.

This is unlike marriage and "matrimonial causes" which are recognised by sections 51(xxi) and (xxii) of the Constitution of Australia and internationally by marriage law and conventions, Hague Convention on Marriages (1978).

Non-marital relationship contract
A de facto relationship is comparable to non-marital relationship contracts (sometimes called "palimony agreements") and certain limited forms of domestic partnership, which are found in many jurisdictions throughout the world.

A de facto Relationship is not comparable to common-law marriage, which is a fully legal marriage that has merely been contracted in an irregular way (including by habit and repute). Only nine U.S. states and the District of Columbia still permit common-law marriage; but common law marriages are otherwise valid and recognised by and in all jurisdictions whose rules of comity mandate the recognition of any marriage that was legally formed in the jurisdiction where it was contracted.

Family law – custody
De facto joint custody is comparable to the joint legal decision-making authority a married couple has over their child(ren) in many jurisdictions (Canada as an example). Upon separation, each parent maintains de facto joint custody, until such time a court order awards custody, either sole or joint.

Business

Monopoly 
A de facto monopoly is a system where many suppliers of a product are allowed but the market is so completely dominated by one that the other players are unable to compete or even survive. The related terms oligopoly and monopsony are similar in meaning and this is the type of situation that antitrust laws are intended to eliminate.

Finance 
In finance, the World Bank has a pertinent definition:

A "de facto government" comes into, or remains in, power by means not provided for in the country's constitution, such as a coup d'état, revolution, usurpation, abrogation or suspension of the constitution.

Intellectual property 
In engineering,  is a system in which the intellectual property and know-how is privately held. Usually only the owner of the technology manufactures the related equipment. Meanwhile, a  consists of systems that have been publicly released to a certain degree so that anybody can manufacture equipment supporting the technology. For instance, in cell phone communications, CDMA1X is a de facto technology, while GSM is a standard technology.

Sports
Examples of a de facto General Manager in sports include Syd Thrift who acted as the GM of the Baltimore Orioles between 1999 and 2002. Bill Belichick, the head coach of the New England Patriots in the NFL does not hold the official title of GM, but serves as de facto general manager as he has control over drafting and other personnel decisions.

See also
 Fact
 Unenforced law

Notes

References

Latin legal terminology
Latin words and phrases